Cadell Ddyrnllwg (Welsh for "Cadell of the Gleaming Hilt"; born c. AD 430) was a mid-5th century King of Powys.

Cadell appears to have been driven out of his father Cadeyrn's kingdom by Irish pirates during the chaos of the Saxon insurrection in Southern Britain. He hid himself amongst the peasants of Powys and became a servant of the Irish chieftain, Benlli, hoping, one day, to find an opportunity to retrieve his inheritance. His chance arose when St. Germanus of Auxerre visited Britain, probably for the second time in AD 447, to combat Pelagian views (opposition to Original Sin). Travelling into the Midlands, St. Germanus heard of the pagan Irish stronghold and, with his many followers, laid siege to the Powysian capital. Cadell showed them what modest hospitality he could in his rural hovel outside the city walls. Germanus eventually had a dreadful premonition and advised Cadell to remove all his friends from within the city walls. That night, the Royal palace was struck by lightning. The resulting fire spread quickly and all within the city were burnt alive. The young Cadell was thus restored to his throne. It is unclear where the kingdom's capital was at the time; tradition suggests the Clwydian hillfort Foel Fenlli, the 'Hill of Benlli', while archaeological evidence points to Caer Guricon (Wroxeter, Shropshire). The latter was occupied well into the 6th century, and an ancient memorial stone bearing the Celtic name Cunorix, known as the Wroxeter Stone, has been discovered here.

Cadell married Gwelfyl, one of the many daughters of King Brychan Brycheiniog. They had a number of children, including Tegid, the father of Gwynllyw, and possibly Gwynfyr Frych, Ystradwel and Ddewer. Cadell apparently died quite young.

References 

House of Gwertherion
Monarchs of Powys
5th-century Welsh monarchs
Sub-Roman monarchs
5th-century births
430 births
Year of birth uncertain
Year of death unknown